is a former Japanese football player. He is currently the goalkeeper coach of Yokohama F. Marinos.

Playing career
Enomoto was born in Kawasaki on May 2, 1983. He joined J1 League club Yokohama F. Marinos from youth team in 2002. He debuted in 2003 and battles with Tatsuya Enomoto for the position after the debut. He became a regular goalkeeper since Tatsuya Enomoto left the club end of 2006 season. However his opportunity to play decreased behind Hiroki Iikura from 2009. Enomoto became a regular goalkeeper again in 2013. However his opportunity to play decreased behind Iikura again from 2015. 

In 2017, Enomoto moved to Urawa Reds. However he could hardly play in the match behind Shusaku Nishikawa. In 2019, Enomoto moved to J3 League club Kataller Toyama.

Later career
After retiring at the end of 2019, Enomoto was appointed as a goalkeeper coach at Yokohama F. Marinos' Soccer School in February 2020. For the 2021 season, he was appointed goalkeeper coach of Yokohamas professional J1 League team.

Career statistics
.

J.League Firsts
 Appearance: March 21, 2003. Yokohama F. Marinos 4 vs 2 Júbilo Iwata, Shizuoka Stadium

Honours
Yokohama F. Marinos
J1 League: 2003, 2004
Emperor's Cup: 2013
Urawa Reds
AFC Champions League: 2017
Suruga Bank Championship: 2017

References

External links

Profile at Yokohama F. Marinos 
Profile at Urawa Reds

1983 births
Living people
Association football people from Kanagawa Prefecture
Japanese footballers
J1 League players
J3 League players
Yokohama F. Marinos players
Urawa Red Diamonds players
Kataller Toyama players
Association football goalkeepers